Daniel Tenn (born October 10, 1981) is a Swedish curler.

Teams

References

External links
 

Living people
1981 births
Swedish male curlers
Universiade medalists in curling
Competitors at the 2007 Winter Universiade
Medalists at the 2007 Winter Universiade
Universiade bronze medalists for Sweden
21st-century Swedish people